Wolverines is a 2014 studio album by the Brooklyn-based band I Am the Avalanche.

Track listing
"Two Runaways" – 3:23
"177" – 2:35
"The Shape I'm In" – 3:29
"Young Kerouacs" – 3:17
"Wolverines" – 1:25
"Anna Lee" – 3:07
"Save Your Name" – 2:52
"Where Were You? " – 4:29
"My Lion Heart" – 2:42
"One Last Time" – 3:53

Credits
Vinnie Caruana – vocals
Michael Ireland – guitar
Kellen Robson – bass
Brett "The Ratt" Romnes – drums
Brandon Swanson – guitar

References 

2014 albums
I Am the Avalanche albums